The  Klann linkage is a planar mechanism designed to simulate the gait of legged animal and function as a wheel replacement, a leg mechanism. The linkage consists of the frame, a crank, two grounded rockers, and two couplers all connected by pivot joints.  It was developed by Joe Klann in 1994 as an expansion of Burmester curves which are used to develop four-bar double-rocker linkages such as harbor crane booms. It is categorized as a modified Stephenson type III kinematic chain.

The proportions of each of the links in the mechanism are defined to optimize the linearity of the foot for one-half of the rotation of the crank. The remaining rotation of the crank allows the foot to be raised to a predetermined height before returning to the starting position and repeating the cycle. Two of these linkages coupled together at the crank and one-half cycle out of phase with each other will allow the frame of a vehicle to travel parallel to the ground.

The Klann linkage provides many of the benefits of more advanced walking vehicles without some of their limitations. It can step over curbs, climb stairs, or travel into areas that are currently not accessible with wheels but does not require microprocessor control or multitudes of actuator mechanisms. It fits into the technological space between these walking devices and axle-driven wheels.

Mechanism 
Klann linkage work on the basis of kinematics where all links gives relative motion with each other. It converts the rotatory motion to linear motion, and looks like an animal walking. 

This animation show the working of klann mechanism.

Comparison with Jansen's linkage 

The Klann mechanism uses six links per leg, whereas the Jansen's linkage developed by Theo Jansen uses eight links per leg, with one degree of freedom.

Example leg 

In  there is a set of coordinates for an example leg:

See also
Wheel
Linkage (mechanical)
Leg mechanism
Mondo Spider
Jansen's linkage
Chebyshev linkage and Chebyshev's Lambda Mechanism

References

External links

 Animation of the linkage's climbing ability
 Clear side-on view of linkage in motion

Mechanicalspider
Mechanisms101
Mondo Spider
Walking Beast
Crabfu

Linkages (mechanical)
Walking vehicles
Robot kinematics
1994 in robotics